Integra Air offered chartered and scheduled flight services, as well as air ambulance medevac services, out of Calgary, Alberta, Canada. The airline ceased operations on August 31, 2018, stating that it was undergoing corporate restructuring. The closure also shut down operations of the air ambulance services.

History
The company started in 1998 with scheduled flights to Edmonton. In 1999, Integra started its chartered service and four years later it began offering aircraft management services. In 2010, Integra Air purchased Bar XH Air, expanding their services to include air medevac. In early 2018, Calgary-based Integra Air came in to assist Orca on March 15, and in a March statement their CEO said “Integra Air is currently in the process of negotiating aircraft, crews and management to support Orca Airways and prevent any further interruption to Orca passengers and customers”.

Destinations
As of April 2018, Integra Air served the following destinations, until ceasing operations.

Alberta
Bonnyville (Bonnyville Airport)
Calgary (Calgary International Airport)

Fleet
As of April 2018, Integra Air had the following aircraft registered with Transport Canada, listed under BAR XH Air:
5 BAe Jetstream 31
4 King Air 200
1 IAI Westwind

The listing also includes a Cessna 150 and a Cessna 172, both with cancelled certificates.

See also 
 List of defunct airlines of Canada

References

External links
Integra Air

Regional airlines of Alberta
Defunct airlines of Canada
Airlines established in 1998
Airlines disestablished in 2018
1998 establishments in Alberta
2018 disestablishments in Alberta
Transport in Calgary
Companies based in Calgary